The economy of the Cook Islands is based mainly on tourism, with minor exports made up of tropical and citrus fruit. Manufacturing activities are limited to fruit-processing, clothing and handicrafts.

As in many other South Pacific nations, the Cook Islands's economy is hindered by the country's isolation from foreign markets, lack of natural resources aside from fish, periodic devastation from natural disasters, and inadequate infrastructure.

Trade deficits are made up for by remittances from emigrants and by foreign aid, overwhelmingly from New Zealand. Efforts to exploit tourism potential, encourage offshore banking, and expand the mining and fishing industries have been partially successful in stimulating investment and growth.

Banking and finance 
Banks in the Cook Islands are regulated under the Banking Act 2011. Banks must be licensed and are supervised by the Cook Islands Financial Supervisory Commission.

The Cook Islands developed an offshore financial services industry in the early 1980s. Allegations that New Zealand-based companies were using it as a tax haven led to the Winebox Inquiry in New Zealand in the 1990s, and in 2000 it was listed as a tax haven by the OECD. In 2002 it was delisted after it agreed to fiscal transparency and to exchange tax information. Allegations of being a tax haven re-emerged in 2013 following the International Consortium of Investigative Journalists Offshore Leaks. Trusts incorporated in the Cook Islands are used to provide anonymity and asset-protection. The Cook Islands also featured in the Panama Papers, Paradise Papers, and Pandora Papers financial leaks.

Economist Vaine Nooana-Arioka has been executive director of the Bank of the Cook Islands since 2008.

Economic statistics 
 GDP
 Purchasing power parity - $183.2 million (2005 est.)
 GDP - real growth rate -.05% (2005); -1.2% (2014); -1.7% (2013). Growth in the Cook Islands has slowed due to a lack of infrastructure projects and accommodation capacity constraints in the tourism sector. Cook Islands economic activity is expected to be flat in FY2016; to grow by 0.2% in FY2017. Inflation 1.8% (FY2016); 2.0% (FY2017). Statistics Asian Development Bank
 GDP - per capita $9 100 (2005 estimate)
 GDP - composition by sector
 Agriculture: 78.9%
 Industry: 9.6%
 Services: 75.3% (2000)
 Population below poverty line
 28.4% of the population lives below the national poverty line. Statistics 2016 Asian Development Bank
 Household income or consumption by percentage share
 Lowest 10%: NA%
 Highest 10%: NA%
 Inflation rate (consumer prices)
 2.1% (2005 est.)
 Labor force
 6,820 (2001)
 Labor force - by occupation
 Agriculture 29%, industry 15%, services 56% (1995)
 Unemployment rate 13.1% (2005)
 Budget
 Revenues:  $70.95 million
 Expenditures:  $69.05 million; including capital expenditures of $5.744 million (FY00/01 est.)
 Industries
 Fruit processing, tourism, fishing, clothing, handicrafts
 Industrial production growth rate
 1% (2002)
 Electricity - production
 28 GW·h (2003)
 Electricity - production by source
 Fossil fuel: 100%
 Hydro: 0%
 Nuclear: 0%
 Other: 0% (2001)
 Electricity - consumption
 34.46 GW·h (2005 est)
 Electricity - exports
 0 kW·h (2003)
 Electricity - imports
 0 kW·h (2003)
 Oil consumption
  (2003)
 Agriculture - products
 Copra, citrus, pineapples, tomatoes, beans, pawpaws, bananas, yams, taro, coffee, pigs, poultry
 Exports
 $5.222 million (2005)
 Exports - commodities
 Copra, papayas, fresh and canned citrus fruit, coffee; fish; pearls and pearl shells; clothing
 Exports - partners
 Australia 34%, Japan 27%, New Zealand 25%, US 8% (2004)
 Imports
 $81.04 million (2005)
 Imports - commodities
 Foodstuffs, textiles, fuels, timber, capital goods
 Imports - partners
 New Zealand 61%, Fiji 19%, US 9%, Australia 6%, Japan 2% (2004)
 Debt - external
 $141 million (1996 est.)
 Economic aid - recipient
 $13.1 million (1995); note - New Zealand furnishes the greater part
 Currency
 1 New Zealand dollar (NZ$) = 100 cents
 Exchange rates
 New Zealand dollars (NZ$) per US$1 - 1.4203 (2005), 1.9451 (January 2000), 1.8886 (1999), 1.8632 (1998), 1.5083 (1997), 1.4543 (1996), 1.5235 (1995)
 Fiscal year
 1 April–31 March

Telecommunications 

Telecom Cook Islands Ltd (TCI) is the sole provider of telecommunications in the Cook Islands. TCI is a private company owned by Spark New Zealand Ltd (60%) and the Cook Islands Government (40%). In operation since July 1991, TCI provides local, national and international telecommunications as well as internet access on all islands except Suwarrow. Communications to Suwarrow is via HF radio.

References

External links 
CIA World Factbook, 2006